George Chester Robinson Wagoner (September 3, 1863 – April 27, 1946) was a U.S. Representative from Missouri who served one week.

Born in Cincinnati, Ohio, Wagoner attended the public schools and Beaumont Hospital Medical College, St. Louis, Missouri.  He served as president of the Wagoner Undertaking Co. and secretary and treasurer of the H.H. Wagoner Realty Co. in St. Louis.

As a Republican, Wagoner successfully contested the election of James Joseph Butler to the Fifty-seventh Congress and served in the final week of his term (February 26 – March 4, 1903).

After his short involvement in politics, Wagoner resumed business activities. He died in St. Louis on April 27, 1946, and was interred in Bellefontaine Cemetery.

References

1863 births
1946 deaths
Republican Party members of the United States House of Representatives from Missouri